Marc Antoine (born 26 April 1977) is a Canadian singer.

Biography
Born in Montreal, Quebec, Antoine is of Haitian descent. He was a musical talent from young age impersonating Michael Jackson. His parents were fans of various types of music (soul, French music, zouk, kompa etc.). As an 11-year adolescent, he was part of a family group Eden with his brothers imitating harmonized tunes in the style of Boyz II Men.

Marc Antoine studied law but concentrated on his music. After meeting renowned Montreal producer Sonny Black, he has broken as a local artist in Quebec and in France with three albums, Comme il se doit (2008), the follow-up Notre histoire (2010) and Je ferai tout (2013). He has had a number of charting singles in France, Belgium and Quebec. "Tant besoin de toi" taken from his debut single remains his most successful hit having reached No. 4 on the SNEP French Singles Chart.

Musical theatre
Marc Antoine is playing the role of Petit Jean (Little John) in the 2013 French musical Robin des Bois. He performs "Lui sait qui je suis" as solo in his role, and sings "À nous" with Nyco Lilliu (Frère Tuck) and M. Pokora (Robin des Bois

Discography

Albums

Singles

Featured in

Songs
2006: "Triste novembre"
2008: "Tant besoin de toi" (music video by John Gabriel Biggs)
2008: "Triste novembre" (2nd version) (music video by John Gabriel Biggs)
2008: "Comme il se doit"
2008: "Plus rien à perdre"
2010: "Qui tu aimes"
2010: "Ballade a la Marc Antoine"
2010: "Nous"
2010: "Remonter le temps (tu me manques) (Marc Antoine and Sarah Riani)
2011: "La promesse"
2012: "Je ferai tout"

Awards and nominations
In 2009, Antoine won an International Achievement Award at the Francophone SOCAN Awards in Montreal.
In 2010, nominated for "Francophone Revelation of the Year" at the NRJ Music Awards

References

1977 births
Living people
Canadian male songwriters
Haitian Quebecers
Singers from Montreal
Songwriters from Quebec
21st-century Black Canadian male singers